Nur-un-Nissa Begum (born  1570) meaning 'Light among Women', was a Timurid princess, the daughter of Ibrahim Husain Mirza and the wife of fourth Mughal emperor Jahangir.

Early life
Born a Timurid princess, Nur-un-Nissa Begum was the daughter of Prince Ibrahim Husain Mirza, a descendant of Prince Umar Shaikh Mirza, second son of Amir Timur. Her mother was Princess Gulrukh Begum, the daughter of Prince Kamran Mirza, son of the first Mughal emperor Babur, and brother of the next emperor Humayun. She had a brother named Prince Muzaffar Husain Mirza, married to Akbar's eldest daughter Khanum Sultan Begum.

In 1572, Gulrukh Begum lost contact with her husband Ibrahim Husain Mirza as he was forced to vacate Gujarat by Akbar. She fled to the Deccan with her children. Ibrahim Husain Mirza, who ultimately fled towards Multan, was captured by the royal officers. In 1573, he died while still in prison.

On their way to Deccan, the ruler of Khandesh attempted to arrest Gulrukh Begum and her children when they passed through the country, but did not succeed in doing so. However, Nur-un-Nissa, who was two years old at that time, fell into his hands. When Akbar heard of this, he ordered to bring the ruler of Khandesh and Nur-un-Nissa Begum to court. After their arrival at the court, she was taken under Akbar's protection, and handed over to the guardians of the imperial harem.

In 1577, Gulrukh Begum and her son Muzaffar Husain came back to Gujarat and renewed their rebellion. However, after some initial successes, Muzaffar Husain was captured by royal officers and was imprisoned. Following the imprisonment of her son, Gulrukh joined her daughter at Agra.

Marriage
In spring of 1593, Gulrukh Begum petitioned a request of her daughter's marriage with Akbar's eldest son Prince Salim Mirza. Akbar agreeded to her request, and this led to their betrothal. The marriage took place on the eve of 26 February 1593 at the house of Akbar's mother Empress Hamida Banu Begum. More than a year later, Akbar married his own daughter Khanum Sultan Begum to Nur-un-Nissa's brother Muzaffar Husain Mirza. On 28 August 1595, Nur-un-Nissa gave birth to the couple's only child, a daughter.

Nur-un-Nissa maintained relations of kinship with her sister-in-law, Khanum Sultan, and the latter too strictly observed the rules of courtesy and proper behaviour towards her. In 1614-15, Jahangir during his stay at Ajmer visited her mother Gulrukh Begum, who was ill at that time. During this time, Shaikh Farid Bhakkari, the author of "Dhakhirat-ul-Khawanin" was serving as a diwan of establishment to her.

Diwan-i-Kamran
Nur-un-Nissa Begum was the owner of "Diwan-i-Kamran", which consisted of poems written by her grandfather Kamran Mirza. Nur-un-Nissa purchased it for three Mohurs.

Ancestry

References

Sources

Wives of Jahangir
16th-century Indian women
16th-century Indian people
17th-century Indian women
Timurid princesses
17th-century Indian Muslims